The Mže is a  long river, mostly in the Czech Republic. Its source is situated in the Griesbach Forest ( above sea level), Germany, near the village of Asch, in the municipality of Mähring, Tirschenreuth district. It passes through the towns of Tachov and Stříbro. At the confluence with the Radbuza, it forms the Berounka in Pilsen. Its major left tributary is Hamerský potok and the right tributary is Úhlava. There are two water dams on the Mže, Lučina and Hracholusky, both in the Tachov district.

References 

Rivers of the Plzeň Region
Rivers of Bavaria
International rivers of Europe
Czech Republic–Germany border
Rivers of the Upper Palatine Forest
Rivers of Germany
Border rivers